Marie de Bièvre (1865–1940) was a Belgian artist known for her still life painting.

Biography
Bièvre was born on 30 January 1865 in Saint-Josse-ten-Noode.

Bièvre exhibited her work in the Woman's Building at the 1893 World's Columbian Exposition in Chicago, Illinois. She also exhibited at the Exposition Internationale d'Anvers, Antwerp in 1894, and the Exposition Universelle, Paris in 1900.

Bièvre died on 7 October 1940 in Elsene.

Gallery

References

External links
  
 images of Marie de Bièvre's work on AskArt

 
1865 births
1940 deaths
19th-century Belgian women artists
20th-century Belgian women artists
19th-century Belgian painters
20th-century Belgian painters